Malevolent Grain is an EP by Wolves in the Throne Room that precedes their third album Black Cascade. This is the first album to feature guitar by Will Lindsay from the now defunct Middian. Jamie Myers from the band Hammers of Misfortune also supplies guest vocals for the song "A Looming Resonance".

Track listing

Personnel
Wolves in the Throne Room
Nathan Weaver - lead vocals, guitar, bass guitar
Aaron Weaver - drums
Will Lindsay - guitar
Additional musicians
Jamie Myers - female vocals on "A Looming Resonance"
Additional personnel
Christophe Szpajdel – logo

Release history

References

2009 EPs
Wolves in the Throne Room albums
Southern Lord Records EPs